Kristina Timofeeva (born 28 August 1993, in Yakutia) is a Russian female archer. At the 2012 Summer Olympics she competed for her country in the Women's team event.

References

Russian female archers
1993 births
Living people
Olympic archers of Russia
Archers at the 2012 Summer Olympics
People from the Sakha Republic
Archers at the 2015 European Games
European Games competitors for Russia
Sportspeople from Sakha
21st-century Russian women